Gamage Haththotuwa Weerasumana Weerasinghe (born 17 November 1975) is a Sri Lankan politician, former provincial minister and Member of Parliament.

Weerasinghe was born on 17 November 1975. He was educated at St. Thomas' College, Matara. He is a member of the Communist Party of Sri Lanka.

Weerasinghe  was a member of Kotagala Divisional Council and the Southern Provincial Council where he held a provincial ministerial portfolio. He was dismissed from his ministerial position in September 2017 for voting against the proposed 20th amendment to the Constitution of Sri Lanka. He contested the 2020 parliamentary election as a Sri Lanka People's Freedom Alliance electoral alliance candidate in Monaragala District and was elected to the Parliament of Sri Lanka.

References

1975 births
Alumni of St. Thomas' College, Matara
Communist Party of Sri Lanka politicians
Local authority councillors of Sri Lanka
Living people
Members of the 16th Parliament of Sri Lanka
Members of the Southern Province Board of Ministers
Sinhalese politicians
Sri Lankan Buddhists
Sri Lanka People's Freedom Alliance politicians
United People's Freedom Alliance politicians